Francesca Bertini (born Elena Seracini Vitiello; 5 January 1892 – 13 October 1985) was an Italian silent film actress. She was one of the most successful silent film stars in the first quarter of the twentieth-century.

Biography
Born in Prato, she was daughter of a woman who may have been an actress, but she was unmarried and Bertini was registered as Elena Taddei at an orphanage in 1892. Her mother, Adelina di Venanzio Fratiglioni, married Arturo Vitiello in 1910 and she took his family name. Bertini began performing on stages at the age of seventeen she began to perform in the just-born Italian movie production. She had a major role in Salvatore Di Giacomo's melodramatic story Assunta Spina.

She had made over 50 films by 1915 including, Histoire d'un pierrot, was under the direction of Baldassarre Negroni in 1913. Gradually she developed her beauty and elegance, plus a strong, intense, and charming personality, which would be the key of her success as a silent movie actress. With Assunta Spina in 1915 she took care of the scripts as well as performing the role of the main character. Bertini was to claim with some support that she was the true director of the film which included novel acting techniques.

She was one of the first film actresses to focus on reality, rather than on a dramatic stereotype, an anticipation of Neorealistic canons. The expression of authentic feelings was the key of her success through many films. She could perform with success the languid decadent heroine as well as  the popular common woman. Other important roles were Odette, Fedora, Tosca and the Lady of the Camellias.

In 1920, Fox Film Corporation in Hollywood offered to sign a contract with her, but she refused: she was married to the wealthy Swiss banker Paul Cartier and wanted to move with him to Switzerland. When her husband died, she moved back to Rome, where she would remain until her death.

She stepped into sound movies as well, but in the meantime the Italian cinema had changed greatly (the period of Telefoni bianchi comedies) and entered into a period of crisis with fascism and censorship. It experienced a definite hiatus with World War II.

Last years
In 1976 Bernardo Bertolucci was able to convince her to emerge from her stubborn silence, accepting a role of a nun in his movie Novecento. She allowed herself to be interviewed in 1981 and this was adapted for a three part TV documentary in 1982. She died in Rome at the age of 93.

Selected filmography

 Lucrezia Borgia (1910) – Lucrezia Borgia
 King Lear (1910, Short) – Cordelia
 Manon Lescaut (1911)
 Lucrezia Borgia (1912) – Lucrezia Borgia
 Il pappagallo della zia Berta (1912)
 Idillio tragico (1912)
 L'avvoltoio (1913) – Maria
 Ninì Verbena (1913) – Ninì Verbena
 La terra promessa (1913)
 Broken Idol (1913, Short)
 Tramonto (1913)
 La bufera (1913) – Maria
 L'ultima carta (1913)
 L'avvoltoio (1913)
 L'arrivista (1913)
 L'arma dei vigliacchi (1913)
 L'anima del demi-monde (1913)
 Pierrot the Prodigal (1914) – Pierrot
 L'Amazzone Mascherata (1914)
 Cabiria
 Rose e spine (1914)
 La principessa straniera (1914)
 Blue Blood (1914) – Princess of Monte Cabello
 Una donna (1914)
 Nelly La Gigolette (1915) – Nelly
 Nella fornace (1915)
 Il capestro degli Asburgo (1915)
 Ivonne, la bella danzatrice (1915) – La contessina Edith / Ivonne, la bella della danza brutale
 The Lady of the Camellias (1915) – Margherita Gauthier
 Assunta Spina (1915) – Assunta Spina
 Don Pietro Caruso (1915)
 Diana, l'affascinatrice (1915) – Diana
 Odette (1916) – Odette
 La perla del cinema (1916)
 La colpa altrui (1916)
 Il destino (1916)
 Lacrymae rerum (1916)
 Vittima dell'ideale (1916)
 Nel gorgo della vita (1916)
 Maligno riflesso (1916)
 L'educanda monella (1916)
 Il patto (1916)
 Fedora (1916) – Fedora
 Baby l'indiavolata (1916)
 Andreina (1917) – Andreina – contessa di Toeplitz
 La piccola fonte (1917) – Teresa
 The Clemenceau Affair (1917) – Iza
 Malìa (1917) – Liliana di Sant'Elmo
 Anima redenta (1917)
 La Tosca (1918) – Floria Tosca
 Frou-Frou (1918) – Gilberta Sartorys detta Frou – Frou
 Mariute (1918)
 La gola (1918) – Comtessa Frescalinda Ciufettino
 L'Orgoglio (1918) – Erminia de Beaumesnil
 L'ira (1918) – Elena
 L'avarizia (1918) – Maria Lorini
 I sette peccati capitali (1918)
 Eugenia Grandet (1918)
 L' Accidia (1919) – Bianca Fanelli
 L'invidia (1919) – Lelia di Santa Croce
 Spiritismo (1919) – Simone
 La lussuria (1919) – Magdalena Dutertre
 La Piovra (1919) – Daria Oblosky
 The Cheerful Soul (1919)
 Countess Sarah (1919, Short)
 La principessa (1919)
 La legge (1919)
 The Conqueror of the World (1919)
 Beatrice (1919)
 The Serpent (1920)
 Princess Giorgio (1920)
 The Fall of the Curtain (1920)
 The Shadow (1920)
 The Sphinx (1920)
 Marion (1920) – Marion
 Maddalena Ferat (1920)
 La ferita (1920)
 Anima selvaggia (1920)
 Amore di donna (1920)
 The Girl from Amalfi (1921)
 La donna, il diavolo, il tempo (1921)
 Amore vince sempre (1921)
 The Knot (1921)
 The Nude Woman (1922)
 Fatale bellezza (1922)
 Marion (1923)
 Oltre la legge (1923)
 The Last Dream (1924)
 The Youth of the Devil (1925) – La vecchia duchessa / Fausta
 Fior di levante (1925)
 Consuelita (1925)
 La Fin De Monte Carlo (1926) – Cora de Marsa
 Odette (1928) – Odette
 Montecarlo (1928)
 La Possession (1929) – Jessie Cordier
 Tu M'Appartiens (1929) – Gisele
 La Femme d'une nuit (1931) – La princesse de Lystrie
 La donna di una notte (1931) – La principessa Elena di Lystria
 Odette (1934) – Odette
 Dora o le Spie (1943)
 A sud niente di nuovo (1957)
 Una ragazza di Praga (1969) – Gabriela
 1900 (Novecento) (1976) – Sister Desolata (final film role)
 Behind the Screen: Stories of Cinema – The Last Diva (1982, TV Movie documentary) – Herself
 Diva Dolorosa (2000, Documentary) – Herself (archive footage)

References

External links

 

1892 births
1985 deaths
Actors from Florence
Italian film actresses
Italian silent film actresses
20th-century Italian actresses
Burials at the Cimitero Flaminio
Women film pioneers